The 1801 Rhode Island gubernatorial election was an uncontested election held on April 1, 1801 to elect the Governor of Rhode Island. Arthur Fenner, the incumbent Governor, was the sole candidate and so won with 100% of the vote.

References

Rhode Island gubernatorial elections
1801 Rhode Island elections
Rhode Island
April 1801 events